Chilcote is a village and civil parish in the North West Leicestershire district of Leicestershire, England. Until 1897 it was in Derbyshire. The parish had a population of 108 according to the 2001 census, including Stretton-en-le-Field and increasing to 200 at the 2011 census.

The village's name means 'the cottages of the children'.

Chilcote lies close to the borders of Derbyshire (to the north), Staffordshire (to the west), and Warwickshire (to the south). Roads from the village only lead to Derbyshire and Warwickshire. It is therefore not possible to travel by road from Chilcote to any other part of Leicestershire without first leaving the county.

Chilcote also plays host to an almost unique geographic phenomenon within the UK, in that its parent county, Leicestershire, borders neighbouring Staffordshire directly over a distance of only about a mile. The boundary is accessible to pedestrians and within easy walking distance of the village centre. There is only one other example in UK of a county boundary this short, and the geography makes it possible to complete a local walk on public rights of way taking in 4 different counties in under 2 hours.

References

External links

Villages in Leicestershire
Civil parishes in Leicestershire
North West Leicestershire District